Lowell Wright (born August 19, 2003) is a Canadian professional soccer player who plays as a forward for Whitecaps FC 2 of the MLS Next Pro.

Early life
Wright was born in Brampton, Ontario to Jamaican parents. At youth level, he played in the Toronto FC Academy, serving as captain of the U-12 team. In 2018, he left the Toronto FC Academy and joined the youth system of Sigma FC. In 2019, he joined the youth system of the Woodbridge Strikers, scoring 42 goals across all competitions for their U-17 side.

Club career
In 2019, Wright joined League1 Ontario side Woodbridge Strikers, scoring one goal in three league appearances and making one appearance in the playoffs.

On July 28, 2020, Wright signed a four-year contract with Canadian Premier League side York9 (later renamed York United), becoming the youngest player to sign for the club, as well as signing the longest contract in club history. His signing was expediated by the COVID-19 pandemic, as the club was initially planning to sign him to begin in January 2021, however, due to the inability of some foreign players to come to Canada due to travel restrictions, he was signed in July 2020. He made his professional debut for York9 on August 15 against Atlético Ottawa and scored a goal in an eventual 2-2 draw, becoming the youngest goal-scorer in Canadian Premier League history at 16 years, 11 months, and 26 days. He scored his first career brace on September 26, 2021 against Valour FC.

In August 2022, he transferred to Whitecaps FC 2 of MLS Next Pro.

International career
In April 2022, Wright was called up to the Canadian Under-20 side for two friendly matches against Costa Rica in San José. In June 2022, he was named to the Canadian U-20 team for the 2022 CONCACAF U-20 Championship. He appeared in all four of the team's games at the tournament, scoring twice.

Career statistics

References

External links

2003 births
Living people
Soccer players from Brampton
Canadian soccer players
Canada men's youth international soccer players
Canadian sportspeople of Jamaican descent
Association football forwards
Toronto FC players
York United FC players
League1 Ontario players
Canadian Premier League players
Woodbridge Strikers players
Sigma FC players
Whitecaps FC 2 players
MLS Next Pro players